The 2010–11 Bundesliga was the 48th season of the Bundesliga, Germany's premier football league. It began on 20 August 2010 and concluded on 14 May 2011. The winter break was in effect between weekends around 18 December 2010 and 15 January 2011. The defending champions were Bayern Munich. The league had also updated its logo for the season. The official match ball is Adidas Torfabrik 2010.

Borussia Dortmund earned its seventh league title with two games to spare on 30 April 2011, beating 1. FC Nürnberg 2–0 at home. FC St. Pauli and Eintracht Frankfurt were relegated to the 2011–12 2. Bundesliga.

Teams
At the end of the 2009–10 season VfL Bochum and Hertha BSC were directly relegated after finishing in the bottom two places of the league table. They were replaced by 1. FC Kaiserslautern, champions of the 2009–10 2. Bundesliga, and runners-up FC St. Pauli. Kaiserslautern returned to the Bundesliga after four years, and St. Pauli re-entered the top division after eight years.

A further place in the league was decided through a two-legged play-off. As in the previous year, 1. FC Nürnberg had to compete, although they were the Bundesliga team this time. FC Augsburg was the 2. Bundesliga's representative. Nuremberg won both matches on aggregate, 3–0, and thus defended their Bundesliga spot.

This was the first ever season since reunification without any teams from neither the former East Germany nor West Berlin since Hertha BSC was relegated.

Stadiums and locations
Several stadiums are undergoing long-term reconstruction work, among them Mercedes-Benz Arena, Millerntor-Stadion and Weserstadion. The capacities of EasyCredit-Stadion and Fritz-Walter-Stadion have also been slightly increased during the off-season, while Hamburg's biggest arena has been renamed to Imtech Arena.

Notes:
 Millerntor-Stadion is currently undergoing reconstruction and expansion, which is due to be finished by 2014.
 Mercedes-Benz Arena will be converted to a football-only stadium during the 2009–10 and 2010–11 seasons. As a consequence, the usual capacity of 58,000 is reduced to 39,950 for the 2010–11 season.
 Weserstadion is undergoing minor reconstruction during the season, with varying reduced capacities during that time.

Personnel and sponsorships

In addition, all matches will feature one match ball as adidas will present a new ball called "Jabulani Torfabrik" ("Goal Factory"). Previously, the home team was responsible for supplying the match ball. More often than not, it was provided by the kitmakers for the teams.

Managerial changes

League table

Results

Relegation play-offs
Borussia Mönchengladbach as 16th-placed team faced 3rd-placed 2. Bundesliga side VfL Bochum in a two-legged play-off. The winner on aggregate score after both matches earned a spot in the 2011–12 Bundesliga.

Borussia Mönchengladbach won 2–1 on aggregate and retained its Fußball-Bundesliga spot for the 2011–12 season.

Statistics

Top scorers
''Source: bundesliga.de

Champion's squad

References

Bundesliga seasons
1
Germany